Boninosuccinea punctulispira is a species of air-breathing land snail, a terrestrial gastropod mollusc in the family Succineidae, the amber snails.

Distribution
This species is endemic to Japan.

References

Molluscs of Japan
Succineidae
Taxonomy articles created by Polbot